Pomponius was Bishop of Naples, known for his opposition of Arianism. Theodoric the Great, ruled most of the Italian Peninsula, at the time at which Pomponius was the head of his see. Theodoric was known as an Arian, but Pomponius remained firm in his convictions.

References

536 deaths
Italian Roman Catholic saints
6th-century Italian bishops
Bishops of Naples
Year of birth unknown